Citelynx was a small UK-based charter airline that operated from Farnborough Airfield, UK, to Europe, Russia and North Africa.

Citelynx transported Arsenal F.C. on more than one occasion.

Fleet
Canadair Regional Jet 200LR (G-ELNX). This was bought from ex-Ansett Australia subsidiary Kendell Airlines, and to date still displays the Ansett tail design.
Embraer ERJ-135ER (G-CDFS) painted in purple and white livery (ex-JetMagic).

See also
 List of defunct airlines of the United Kingdom

Defunct airlines of the United Kingdom